(1881) is a romantic opera in 4 acts by Carl Martin Reinthaler to a libretto by Heinrich Bulthaupt freely based on the drama  by Heinrich von Kleist. Reinthaler began work on the project in 1875.

References

Compositions by Carl Martin Reinthaler
1881 operas
German-language operas
Operas based on works by Heinrich von Kleist
Operas
Operas based on plays